The 2013 Football Queensland season was the first season under a new competition format in Queensland, with NPL Queensland replacing the Queensland State League. Below NPL Queensland is a regional structure of ten zones with their own leagues. The strongest of the zones is Football Brisbane with its senior men’s competition consisting of five divisions.

The NPL Queensland premiers qualified for the National Premier Leagues finals series, competing with the other state federation champions in a final knockout tournament to decide the National Premier Leagues Champion for 2013.

Men's League Tables

2013 National Premier League Queensland

The National Premier League Queensland 2013 season was played over 22 rounds, from March to August 2013.

Finals

2013 Brisbane Premier League

The 2013 Brisbane Premier League was the 31st edition of the Brisbane Premier League which has been a second level domestic association football competition in Queensland since the Queensland State League was formed in 2008. Football Brisbane had restructured its competition from this season with the introduction of four Capital League divisions below the BPL. One consequence of the restructure was that Football Brisbane decided there would be no relegation from the BPL this season. 12 teams competed, all playing each other twice for a total of 22 rounds.

Finals

2013 Capital League 1

The 2013 Capital League 1 season was the first edition of the Capital League 1 as the third level domestic football competition in Queensland. 12 teams competed, all playing each other twice for a total of 22 matches.

Finals

2013 Capital League 2

The 2013 Capital League 2 season was the first edition of the Capital League 2 as the fourth level domestic football competition in Queensland. 12 teams competed, all playing each other twice for a total of 22 matches.

Finals

2013 Capital League 3

The 2013 Capital League 3 season was the first edition of the Capital League 3 as the fifth level domestic football competition in Queensland. 11 teams competed, all playing each other twice for a total of 20 matches. Acacia Ridge withdrew during the season and was relegated to the 2014 Capital League 4.

Finals

2013 Capital League 4

The 2013 Capital League 4 season was the first edition of the Capital League 4 as the sixth level domestic football competition in Queensland. 11 teams competed, all playing each other twice for a total of 20 matches. Springfield United withdrew halfway through the season, leaving the remaining teams to play 19 matches.

Finals

Women's League Tables

2013 Women's SEQ Diamond League

The 2013 Women's South-East Queensland Diamond League season was the top level domestic football of women's competition in Queensland. 10 teams competed and played each other twice. A finals series after the regular season decided the champion team.

Source: sportsTG

Finals

References

2013 in Australian soccer
Football Queensland seasons